Paracedicus is a genus of Asian araneomorph spiders in the family Cybaeidae, and was first described by Victor R. Fet in 1993. First placed as a subgenus of Cedicus, it was elevated to genus status in 2003.

Species
 it contains seven species:
Paracedicus baram Levy, 2007 – Israel
Paracedicus darvishi Mirshamsi, 2018 – Iran
Paracedicus ephthalitus (Fet, 1993) (type) – Turkmenistan
Paracedicus feti Marusik & Guseinov, 2003 – Azerbaijan
Paracedicus gennadii (Fet, 1993) – Iran, Turkmenistan
Paracedicus geshur Levy, 2007 – Israel
Paracedicus kasatkini Zamani & Marusik, 2017 – Iran

References

Araneomorphae genera
Cybaeidae
Spiders of Asia